This is an incomplete list of works written by the Austrian composer Johann Strauss II (1825–1899).

Operettas

Opera 
 Ritter Pázmán (Knight Pázmán), komische Oper in 3 acts, libretto by L Doczi, after J Arany (Vienna, 1892)

Ballet 
 Aschenbrödel Cinderella (1899)

Waltzes 
 Erster Gedanke, "First Thought" (1831)
 Sinngedichte, Op. 1, Epigrams (1844)
 Gunstwerber, Op. 4, Wooers of Favour (1844)
 Serailtänze, Op. 5, Dances of the Harem (1844)
 Die Jungen Wiener, Op. 7, The Young Viennese (1845)
 Faschingslieder, Op. 11, Carnival Songs (1846)
 Jugendträume, Op. 12, Youthful Dreams (1846)
 Sträußchen, Op. 15, Bouquets (1846)
 Berglieder, Op. 18, Mountain Songs (1845)
 Lind-Gesänge, Op. 21, Lind's Song (1846)
 Die Österreicher, Op. 22, The Austrians (1845)
 Zeitgeister, Op. 25, Spirits of the Age (1846)
 Die Sanguiniker, Op. 27
 Die Zillerthaler, Walzer im Ländlerstil Op. 30
 Irenen-Walzer, Op. 32,  Irene (1847)
 Die Jovialen, Walzer, Op. 34
 Architekten-Ball-Tänze, Op. 36
 Sängerfahrten, Op. 41, Singers' Journeys (1847)
 Wilde Rosen, Op. 42
 Ernte-Tänze, Op. 45
 Dorfgeschichten, Village Stories Op. 47
 Klange aus der Walachei, Op. 50, Echoes from Walachia (1850)
 Freiheitslieder, Songs of Liberty Op. 52
 Burschenlieder, Student Songs Op. 55
 Einheits-Klänge, Sounds of Unity Op. 62
 Fantasiebilder, Op. 64
 D'Woaldbuama, Die Waldbuben, Walzer im Ländlerstil, The Forest Lads, Waltz in the style of a country dance Op. 66
 Aeols-Töne, Aeolian Sounds Op. 68
 Die Gemütlichen, Op. 70
 Frohsinns-Spenden, Op. 73, Gifts of Cheerfulness (1850)
 Lava-Ströme, Op. 74, Streams of Lava (1850)
 Maxing-Tänze, Op. 79
 Luisen-Sympathie-Klänge, Op. 81
 Johannis-Käferln, Fireflies Op. 82
 Heimaths-Kinder, Op. 85
 Aurora-Ball-Tänze, Op. 87
 Hirten-Spiele, Op. 89, Pastoral Play (1850/1851)
 Orakel-Sprüche, Oracles Op. 90
 Rhadamantus-Klänge, Op. 94, Echoes of Rhadamantus (1851)
 Idyllen, Op. 95, Idylls (1851)
 Fraunkäferin, Ladybugs Op. 99
 Mephistos Höllenrufe, Op. 101, Cries of Mephistopheles from Hell (1851)
 Liebeslieder, Op. 114, Lovesongs (1852)
 Phönix-Schwingen, Op. 125, Wings of the Phoenix (1853)
 Solon-Sprüche, Op. 128, Judgements of Solon (1853)
 Wiener Punsch-Lieder, Op. 131, Vienna Punch Songs (1853)
 Vermälungs-Toaste, Op. 136, Wedding Toasts (1853)
 Knall-Kügerln, Op. 140, Firecracker (1853)
 Wellen und Wogen, Op. 141, Waves and Billows (1853)
 Schneeglöckchen, Op. 143, Snowdrops (1854)
 Novellen, Op. 146, Legal Amendments (1854)
 Ballg'schichten, Op. 150, Tales of the Ball (1854)
 Myrthen-Kränze, Op. 154, Myrtle Wreaths (1855)
 Nachtfalter, Op. 157, Moths (1855)
 Glossen, Op. 163, Marginal Notes (1855)
 Man lebt nur einmal!, Op. 167, You Only Live Once! (1855)
 Gedanken auf den Alpen, Op. 172, Thoughts in the Alps (1856)
 Juristen-Ball-Tänze, Op. 177, Jurists' Ball Dances (1856)
 Abschieds-Rufe, Op. 179, Cries of Farewell (1856)
 Grossfürsten Alexandra-Walzer, Op. 181, Grand Duchess Alexandra's Waltz (1856)
 Krönungslieder, Op. 184, Coronation Songs (1857)
 Paroxysmen, Op. 189, Paroxysms (1857)
 Controversen, Op. 191, Controversies (1857)
 Wien, mein Sinn!, Op. 192, Vienna, my soul! (1857)
 Phänomene, Op. 193, Phenomena (1857)
 Telegraphische Depeschen, Op. 195, Telegraphic Despatches (1858)
 Souvenir de Nizza, Op. 200, Souvenir of Nice (1858)
 Vibrationen, Op. 204, Vibrations (1858)
 Abschied von St. Petersburg, Op. 210, Farewell to Saint Petersburg (1858)
 Gedankenflug, Op. 215, Thoughtless Flights (1859)
 Hell und voll, Op. 216, Bright and Full (1859)
 Irrlichter, Op. 218, Will-o-wisps (1859)
 Promotionen, Op. 221, Graduations (1859)
 Schwungräder, Op. 223, Flywheels (1859)
Reiseabenteuer Walzer, Op. 227, Travel Adventures Waltz (1859)
 , Op. 232, Life's Awakener (1860)
 Accelerationen, Op. 234, Accelerations (1860)
 Immer heiterer, Op. 235, More and More Cheerful (1860)
 Thermen Walzer, Op. 245, Thermen Waltz
 Grillenbanner, Op. 247, Banisher of Gloom (1861)
Wahlstimmen Walzer, Op. 250, Votes Waltz (1861)
 Klangfiguren, Op. 251, Sound Figures (1861)
 Dividenden, Op. 252, Dividends (1861)
Schwärmereien, Op. 253 (1861/1862)
Die ersten Curen Walzer, Op. 261 The First Cure Waltz (1861/1862)
Colonnen Walzer, Op. 262, Columns Waltz (1862)
 Patronessen, Op. 264, Patronesses (1862)
 Concurrenzen, Op. 267, Rivalry (1862)
 Wiener Chronik, Op. 268, Vienna Chronicle (1862)
 Karnevalsbotschafter, Op. 270, Carnival Ambassador (1862)
 Leitartikel, Op. 273, Leading Article (1863)
 Morgenblätter, Op. 279, Morning Journals (1863)
 Studentenlust, Op. 285, Students' Joy (1864)
 Aus den Bergen, Op. 292, From the Mountains (1864)
 Feuilleton, Op. 293, (1865)
 Bürgersinn, Op. 295, Citizen Spirit (1865)
 Flugschriften, Op. 300, Pamphlets (1865)
 Wiener Bonbons, Op. 307, Viennese Sweets (1866)
 Feenmärchen, Op. 312, Fairytales (1866)
 An der schönen blauen Donau, Op. 314, On the Beautiful Blue Danube, or The Blue Danube (1866)
 Künstlerleben, Op. 316, Artists' Life (1867)
 Telegramme, Op. 318, Telegrams (1867)
 Die Publicisten, Op. 321, The Publicists (1868)
 G'schichten aus dem Wienerwald, Op. 325, Tales from the Vienna Woods (1868)
 Illustrationen, Op. 331, Illustrations (1869)
 Wein, Weib und Gesang, Op. 333, Wine, Women and Song (1869)
 Königslieder, Op. 334, Songs for a King (1869)
 Freuet euch des Lebens, Op. 340, Enjoy Life (1870)
 Neu Wien, Op. 342, New Vienna (1870)
 Tausend und eine Nacht, Op. 346, Thousand and One Nights (1871)
 Autograph Waltzes without opus number (1872)
 Farewell to America without opus number (1872)
 Wiener Blut, Op. 354, Viennese Blood (1873)
 Carnevalsbilder, Op. 357, Carnival Pictures (1873)
 Bei uns z'Haus, Op. 361, At Home (1873)
 Wo die Zitronen blühen, Op. 364, Where the Lemons Blossom (1874)
 Du und du from Die Fledermaus, Op. 367, You and you (1874)
 Cagliostro-Walzer, Op. 370 (1875)
 O schöner Mai!, Op. 375, Oh Lovely May! (1877)
 Kennst du mich?, Op. 381, Do you know me? (1878)
 Rosen aus dem Süden, Op. 388, Roses from the South (1880)
 Nordseebilder, Op. 390, North Sea Pictures (1880)
 Myrthenblüten, Op. 395, Myrtle Blossoms (1881)
 Kuss-Walzer, Op. 400, Kiss Waltz (1881)
 Italienischer Walzer, Op. 407, Italian Waltz (1882)
 Frühlingsstimmen, Op. 410, Voices of Spring (1882)
 Lagunen-Walzer, Op. 411, Lagoon Waltz (1883)
 Schatz-Walzer, Op. 418, Treasure Waltz (1885)
 Wiener Frauen, Op. 423, Viennese Ladies (1886)
 Donauweibchen, Op. 427, Danube Maiden (1887)
 Kaiser-Jubiläum-Jubelwalzer, Op. 434, Emperor Jubilation (1888)
 Kaiser-Walzer, Op. 437, Emperor Waltz (1888)
 Rathausball-Tänze, Op. 438, City Hall Ball (1890)
 Gross-Wien, Op. 440, Great Vienna (1891)
 Seid umschlungen, Millionen!, Op. 443, Be Embraced, You Millions! (1892)
 Märchen aus dem Orient, Op. 444, Tales from the Orient (1892)
 Hochzeitsreigen, Op. 453, Wedding Dance (1893)
 Ich bin dir gut (Jakuba Waltz), Op. 455 (1894)
 Gartenlaube Waltz, Op. 461 Garden Leaves (1894)
 Klug Gretelein, Op. 462, Clever Gretel (1895)
 Trau, schau, wem!, Op. 463, Take Care in Whom You Trust! (1895)
 Heut' ist Heut', Op. 471, Today is Today (1897)
 An der Elbe, Op. 477, On the Elbe (1898)
 Klänge aus der Raimundzeit, Op. 479, Echoes from the days of Raimund (1898)

Polkas 
 Herzenslust, Op. 3, Heart's Content (1844)
 Amazonen-Polka, Op. 9
 Czechen-Polka, Op. 13, Czech Polka (1845)
 Bachus-Polka, Op. 38, Bacchus (1847)
 Explosions-Polka, Op. 43
 Warschauer Polka, Op. 84, Warsaw Polka
 Harmonie Polka, Op. 106
 Elektro-magnetische, Op. 110 Electro-magnetic (1852)
 Blumenfest, Op. 111, Flower Festival (1852)
 Annen, Op. 117, Anna (1852)
 Zehner-Polka, Op. 121, The Ten (1852)
 Veilchen, Op. 132, Violets
 Neuhauser-Polka, Op. 137, Neuhaus (1853)
 Schnellpost-Polka, Op. 159 (1855) 
 Aurora, Op. 165
 Alexandrinen-Polka, Polka française, Op. 198 (1858)
 L'Enfantillage, Polka française, Op. 202, Child's Play (1858)
 Hellenen-Polka, for orchestra, Op. 203
 Champagner-Polka, Op. 211 (1858)
 Tritsch-Tratsch-Polka, Op. 214, Chit-chat (1858)
 Gruß an Wien, Op. 225, Greetings to Vienna (1859)
 Jäger-Polka, Polka-française, Op. 229, Hunter's Polka (1859)
 Drollerie-Polka, Op. 231, Drollery (1860)
 Maskenzug, Op. 240, Masked Ball (1860)
 Perpetuum Mobile, Op. 257 (1861)
 Furioso-Polka (quasi galopp), Op 260, (1861)
 Studenten-Polka (française), Op. 263 (1862)
 Demolirer-Polka, Polka-française, Op. 269, Demolition Men (1862)
 Bluette Polka-française, Op. 271
 Vergnügungszug, Op. 281, Journey Train (1864)
 Gut bürgerlich, Polka-française, Op. 282, Respectable Citizenry (1864)
 'S gibt nur a Kaiserstadt, 's gibt nur a Wien!, Op. 291, Only one Imperial City, one Vienna
 Elektrophor, polka-schnell, Op. 297, Electrophorous (1865)
 Kreuzfidel, Op. 301, Cross-Fiddling
 Express, polka-schnell, Op. 311
 Lob der Frauen Polka-mazurka, Op. 315, Praise of Women
 Postillon d'amour Polka-française, Op. 317 (1867)
 Leichtes Blut, polka-schnell, Op. 319, Light Blood (1867)
 Figaro-Polka, Op. 320 (1867)
 Stadt und Land Polka-mazurka, Op. 322, Town and Country
 Ein Herz, ein Sinn! Polka-mazurka, Op. 323, One Heart, One Mind!
 Unter Donner und Blitz, Op. 324, Thunder & Lightning (1868)
 Freikugeln, Op. 326, Free-shooter (1868)
 Fata Morgana Polka-mazurka, Op. 330
 Éljen a Magyar! polka-schnell, Op. 332, Long live the Magyar!
 Im Krapfenwald'l Polka-française, Op. 336, In Krapfen's Woods (1869)
 Von Der Börse Polka-française, Op. 337, From The Bourse (1869)
 Louischen Polka-française, Op. 339 (1869)
 Im Sturmschritt, Op. 348, At the Double!
 Die Bajadere, Op. 351, The Bayadere
 Vom Donaustrande, Op. 356, By the Danube's Shores
 Gruß aus Österreich Polka-mazurka, Op. 359
 Fledermaus-Polka, Op. 362, Fledermaus Polka (1874)
 , polka-schnell, Op. 365 (1874), based on themes from Die Fledermaus
 Glücklich ist, wer vergisst! Polka-mazurka, Op. 368, Happy is he who forgets! (1874)
 Bitte schön! Polka-française, Op. 372, If You Please! (1875)
 Auf der Jagd, Op. 373, On the Hunt! (1875)
 Licht und Schatten, Op. 374, Light and Shadow (1875)
 Banditen-Galopp, Op. 378, Bandits' Galop (1877)
 Kriegers Liebchen, Polka-mazurka, Op. 379,  Soldier's Sweetheart (fashioned from themes in the operetta Prinz Methusalem, 1877)
 Pariser Polka-française, Op. 382, Paris (1878)
 Waldine, Op. 385 (1879)
 Pizzicato Polka (1869, no opus number; written in collaboration with his brother Josef Strauss)
 So Ängstlich Sind Wir Nicht, Op. 413 (Schnell-Polka (Galopp) from the comic operetta Eine Nacht in Venedig )
 Annina, Polka-Mazurka, Op. 415 (1883)
 Durch's Telephon, Op. 439, Over the Telephone (1890)
 Neue Pizzicato Polka, Op. 449, New Pizzicato Polka
 Klipp-Klapp Galopp, Op. 466

Marches 
 Patrioten, Op. 8 (1845)
 Austria, Op. 20 (1846)
 Fest, Op. 49 (1847)
 Revolutions-Marsch, Op. 54 (1848)
 Studenten-Marsch, Op. 56, Students' March (1848)
 Brünner Nationalgarde, Op. 58, Brno National Guard (1848)
 Kaiser Franz Josef-Jubiläums-Marsch, no op. (1848)
 Kaiser Franz Josef, Op. 67, Emperor Francis Joseph (1849)
 Triumph, Op. 69 (1850)
 Wiener Garnison, Op. 77, Viennese Garrison (1850)
 Ottinger Reiter, Op. 83 (1850)
 Kaiser-Jäger, Op. 93 (1851)
 Viribus unitis, Op. 96, "With United Strength" (1851)
 Grossfürsten, Op. 107 (1852)
 Sachsen-Kürassier, Op. 113, Saxon-Cuirassiers (1852)
 Wiener Jubel-Gruss, Op. 115, Viennese Joyful Greetings (1852)
 Kaiser-Franz-Josef-Rettungs-Jubel, Op. 126, Joy at Deliverance of Emperor Franz Josef (1853)
 Caroussel, Op. 133, Carousel (1853)
 Kron, Op. 139 (1853)
 Erzherzog Wilhelm Genesungs, Op. 149 (1854)
 Napoleon, Op. 156 (1854)
 Alliance (musical work), Op. 158 (1854)
 Krönungs, Op. 183, Coronation (1856)
 Fürst Bariatinsky, Op. 212 (1858)
 Deutscher Kriegermarsch, Op. 284 (1864)
 Verbrüderungs, Op. 287, Fraternization (1864)
 Persischer Marsch, Op. 289, Persian March (1864)
 Kaiser-Alexander-Huldings-Marsch, op. 290 Tsar Alexander Homage March (1864)
 Egyptischer Marsch, Op. 335, Egyptian March (1869)
 Indigo-Marsch, Op. 349, (from Indigo und die vierzig Rauber) (1871)
 Russische Marsch-Fantasie, Op. 353, Russian March-Fantasy (1872)
 Hoch Osterreich!, Op. 371, Hail Austria (from Cagliostro in Wien)
 Jubelfest, Op. 396, Jubilee Festival (1881)
 Der lustige Krieg, Op. 397 (1882)
 Matador, Op. 406, (on Themes from Das Spitzentuch der Königin) (1883)
 Habsburg Hoch!, Op. 408, Hail Habsburg (1882)
 Aufzugsmarsch (from Indigo und die vierzig Rauber) (1883)
 Einzugsmarsch aus Der Zigeunerbaron (1885)
 Russischer Marsch, Op. 426, Russian March (1886)
 Reiter, Op. 428, (from Simplicius) (1888)
 Spanischer Marsch, Op. 433, Spanish March (1888)
 Fest, Op. 452, Festival (1893)
 Živio!, Op. 456, Your Health (1894)
 Es war so wunderschön, Op. 467, It Was So Wonderful (from Waldmeister) (1896)
 Deutschmeister Jubiläums, Op. 470 (1896)
 Auf's Korn!, Op. 478, Take Aim! (1898)

Quadrilles 
 Debut-Quadrille, Op. 2 (1844)
 Cytheren-Quadrille, Op. 6 (1844; 1845)
 Serben-Quadrille, Op. 14 (1846)
 Odeon-Quadrille, Op. 29 (1846)
 Zigeunerin-Quadrille, Op. 24 (1846)
 Wilhelminen-Quadrille, Op. 37 (1847) named after the spouse, Wilhelmina, of the dance master , the work's dedicatee
 Sans-Souci-Quadrille, Op. 63, Carefree (1849)
 Künstler-Quadrille (Artist Quadrille), Op. 71 (1850)
 Sofien-Quadrille, Op. 75, Sophie (1850)
 Le beau Monde (Fashionable Society), Op. 199 (1857)
 Künstler-Quadrille, Op. 201 (1858)
 Dinorah-Quadrille, Op. 224, after motifs from the opera Dinorah, oder Die Wallfahrt nach Ploërmel
 New melodies Quadrille op. 254, after italian opera works
 Slovanka-Quadrille, Op. 338, after Russian motifs
 Indigo-Quadrille, Op. 344 (1871)
 Fledermaus-Quadrille, Op. 363 (1874)
 Cagliostro-Quadrille, Op. 369 (1875)

References

Jacob, H. E. Johann Strauss, Father and Son: A Century of Light Music. The Greystone Press, 1940.
Johann Strauss II list of works at Classical Archives

External links
List of works by Johann Strauss Jr. at the International Music Score Library Project

 
Strauss, Johann 2